Sōng gāo (Shanghainese: Son1-kau1) is a Shanghai snack composed of rice flour, sugar, and water, with azuki beans embedded throughout the cake. The cake also has a red bean (azuki) paste filling. This dessert is steamed as a large round cake and is then partitioned into sections for eating. Madame Chiang Kai-shek, who loved to eat sōng gāo, had the Grand Hotel of Taipei to include her version of the cake on the hotel's menu, which the hotel continues to offer to this day.

See also
 List of cakes

References

Chinese desserts
Shanghai cuisine
Cakes